Speights Town (or Speightstown), was launched at Liverpool in 1784 as a West Indiaman, sailing between Liverpool an Barbados. She was wrecked in late 1794.

Career
Speights Town first appeared in Lloyd's Register (LR) in the volume for 1786.

In March 1786 Lloyd's List reported that Speightstown, Jackson, master, and Susannah, Byrne, master, were transshipping to  the cargo of Africa, Ash, master, which had been condemned at Barbados.

Richard Hall was appointed master on 15 November 1790. Captain Richard Hall acquired a letter of marque on 28 February 1793, essentially immediately after the outbreak of war with France.

Lloyd's List reported in March 1793 that the letters of marque Speightstown and Harriot had recaptured Camilla, Dunbar, master. A French privateer of 14 guns had captured Camilla as she was on her way from Salonica to London. Camilla came into Hoylake. 

William Rimmer was appointed master on 10 March 1793.

Loss
Speightstown, Remmer, master, was wrecked in the Orkney Islands while returning to Liverpool from the Baltic. Her crew were rescued.

Citations and references
Citations

References
 

1784 ships
Age of Sail merchant ships of England
Maritime incidents in 1794